This is a list of notable events in music from 1982, a year in which Madonna made her debut and Michael Jackson released Thriller, which holds the title for the world's best selling album.

Specific locations
1982 in British music
1982 in Norwegian music

Specific genres
1982 in country music
1982 in heavy metal music
1982 in hip hop music
1982 in jazz

Events

January–March 
January 15 – K.C. and the Sunshine Band's Harry Wayne Casey is seriously injured in an automobile accident in Miami, Florida.
January 20 – Ozzy Osbourne bites the head off a live bat thrown at him during a performance in Des Moines, Iowa. He thought it was rubber.
January 21 – B. B. King donates his personal record collection, which includes nearly 7,000 rare blues records, to the University of Mississippi's Center for the Study of Southern Culture.
January 22 – Tommy Tucker, writer of "Hi Heel Sneakers", dies of carbon tetrachloride poisoning sustained while finishing floors in his home.
February 13 – A 300-pound (136 kg) gravestone from the grave of Lynyrd Skynyrd singer Ronnie Van Zant is stolen from an Orange Park, Florida, cemetery. Police find the gravestone two weeks later in a dry river bed.
February 19 – Ozzy Osbourne is arrested after urinating on The Alamo, in San Antonio, Texas.
February 20 – Pat Benatar marries her guitarist, Neil Giraldo, on the Hawaiian island of Maui.
February 24 – The 24th Annual Grammy Awards are presented in Los Angeles, hosted by Quincy Jones (who wins a total of five awards). John Lennon and Yoko Ono's Double Fantasy (the final album released by Lennon in his lifetime) wins Album of the Year, while Kim Carnes' "Bette Davis Eyes" wins both Record of the Year and Song of the Year. Sheena Easton wins Best New Artist.
February 27 – The D'Oyly Carte Opera Company gives its final performance at the Adelphi Theatre after more than 110 years.
March 3 – The Mamas & the Papas begin a reunion tour with a show in the New York club The Other End with original members John Phillips and Denny Doherty, along with Mackenzie Phillips and Spanky McFarlane replacing Michelle Gilliam and Mama Cass respectively.
March 4 – Frank Zappa's son Dweezil and daughter Moon Unit form Fred Zeppelin.
March 5 – Comedian and Blues Brother John Belushi is found dead of an apparent drug overdose in the Chateau Marmont in Los Angeles.
March 18 – Teddy Pendergrass is severely injured in a car accident in Philadelphia. Pendergrass's injuries result in him being paralyzed from the chest down.
March 19 – Ozzy Osbourne's lead guitarist, Randy Rhoads, is killed in a freak accident in Leesburg, Florida, when the plane in which he is riding buzzes Osbourne's tour bus and crashes into a house. The plane's pilot and a female passenger are also killed.
 March 22 – Iron Maiden release The Number of the Beast, the critically acclaimed yet controversial album often hailed as Iron Maiden's greatest. This was Iron Maiden's first album to feature singer Bruce Dickinson and their first to hit number one in the UK charts.
March 28 – In Los Angeles, David Crosby is arrested for possession of Quaaludes and drug paraphernalia, driving under the influence of cocaine and carrying a concealed weapon.

April–August 
April 13 – David Crosby is arrested on drug charges for the second time in three weeks when Dallas police catch him preparing cocaine backstage before a show.
April 15 – Billy Joel is seriously injured in a motorcycle accident in Long Island, New York. Joel spends over a month in the hospital undergoing physical therapy for his hand.
April 17 – Johnny Cash hosts Saturday Night Live with Cash and Elton John and his classic band as the musical guests. Cash sings I Walk The Line, Folsom Prison Blues, Ring of Fire and Sunday Morning Coming Down. John sings Empty Garden (Hey Hey Johnny) and Ball and Chain. The latter would not appear on the NBC show again until 2011.
April 24 – Germany wins the 27th annual Eurovision Song Contest, held in the Harrogate Conference Centre, North Yorkshire, with the song "Ein bißchen Frieden", sung by 17-year-old Nicole. She also records the song in English as "A Little Peace", which becomes the 500th chart-topping single in the UK.
April 26
Rod Stewart is mugged in Los Angeles. Stewart loses his $50,000 Porsche to the mugger, but is not hurt. The car is recovered several days later.
Joe Strummer vanishes, forcing The Clash to postpone their U.K. tour.
April 30 – Influential rock journalist Lester Bangs dies in his New York apartment of an apparent accidental overdose of prescription drugs.
May 10- The Clash Drummer Topper Headon is fired from the band when his heroin addiction became too prevalent.
May 14 – The first Prince's Trust charity concert is held at the National Exhibition Centre in Birmingham. With the Prince of Wales (now Charles III) in attendance, Status Quo, becomes the first contemporary band to play to British royalty.
May 18 – Three weeks after disappearing, Joe Strummer and his girlfriend are found living in Paris, two days after they ran the Paris Marathon.
May 21 – Queen release their tenth studio album, Hot Space, to immense critical outcry. The decision to make a dance-pop album with prominent disco influences at the height of American backlash against the latter genre renders the band a pariah in the United States, and their shift from traditional rock alienates their fans in the United Kingdom. Queen would not recover from the resulting backlash in the United Kingdom until after their Live Aid performance in 1985, while they would remain unpopular in the United States until after Freddie Mercury's death in 1991.
May 23 – Pink Floyd – The Wall, a film adaptation of Pink Floyd's 1979 album The Wall, premieres at the Cannes Film Festival; the film's wide release would later begin on July 15.
May 26 – The Rolling Stones open their European tour in Aberdeen, Scotland.
May 29 – Duran Duran's album Rio peaks at number 2 on the UK Albums Chart in its second week on the chart and will remain on the chart for almost two years. 
June 11 – Grease 2, starring Maxwell Caulfield and Michelle Pfeiffer (in her feature film debut), is released.
 June 16 – James Honeyman-Scott dies of heart failure caused by cocaine intolerance. He was 25 years old.
June 19 – Amy Grant marries Gary Chapman.
July 3 – ABC's debut album The Lexicon of Love enters the UK Albums Chart at number 1 and remain at the top position for four consecutive weeks.
July 4 – Ozzy Osbourne marries his manager Sharon Arden in Maui, Hawaii.
July 21 – A second Prince's Trust charity concert is held at the Dominion Theatre in London. Performers include Pete Townshend, Robert Plant, Madness, Phil Collins, Joan Armatrading and Kate Bush.
August 17 – In Langenhagen near Hanover, Germany began the first mass production of the compact disc.
August 18 – Four streets in Liverpool are named after each of The Beatles.
August 31 – Ronnie James Dio plays his final show with Black Sabbath (until 1992).

September–December 
September 3–5 – The first US Festival is held over Labor Day Weekend near Devore, California. The Police, Tom Petty & the Heartbreakers, Fleetwood Mac, Grateful Dead, Talking Heads and The B-52's are among the many performers.
September 22 – The Who begin their only formally announced "farewell" tour in Washington, D.C.
October 1 – The first compact discs appear in music stores in Japan.
October 1 – The Nightfly by Donald Fagen is released. The record has since been critically acclaimed, and was nominated for 7 Grammys.
October 6 – Madonna's debut single, "Everybody", is released on Sire Records.
October 7 – The musical Cats begins its 18-year run on Broadway.
November 1 –  The breakup of the band Blondie is announced publicly.
November 5 – The first edition of The Tube is broadcast on Channel 4 in the UK.  Guests on the first programme include The Jam, making their last live TV appearance together.
November 6 – Tears for Fears first hit single "Mad World" peaks at number 3 on the UK Singles Chart during its 17-week chart run.
November 21 – Joni Mitchell marries producer and bassist Larry Klein in Malibu.
November 25–27 – The Jamaica World Music Festival is held in Montego Bay, Jamaica. Acts over the three-day festival include Peter Tosh, Rick James, The Clash, Grateful Dead, Aretha Franklin and, in their final show before disbanding, Squeeze.
November 29 – Sena Jurinac appears on stage for the last time, with the Vienna State Opera.
November 30 – Michael Jackson releases his sixth studio album Thriller, which would go on to be the greatest selling album of all time at 70 million units sold worldwide.
December – Iron Maiden drummer Clive Burr is fired and replaced by Nicko McBrain formerly of the French band Trust.
December 3 – The most successful group of the 1970s, ABBA, release their final original single "Under Attack". A split is never officially announced.
December 31 – The eleventh annual New Year's Rockin' Eve special airs on ABC, with appearances by The Go-Go's, Hall & Oates, Ronnie Milsap, Barry Manilow and Jermaine Jackson.

Bands formed 
See Musical groups established in 1982

Bands disbanded 
See :Category:Musical groups disestablished in 1982

Albums released 
In the US, the RIAA stated that 2,630 albums, 2,710 cassettes and 2,285 singles were released.

January

February

March

April

May

June

July

August

September

October

November

December

Release date unknown 

2x45 – Cabaret Voltaire
Age to Age – Amy Grant
Album – Generic Flipper – Flipper
Ambient 4: On Land – Brian Eno
And You Thought You Were Normal – Nash the Slash
Arias & Symphonies – Spoons
Back from Samoa – Angry Samoans
Bad Brains – Bad Brains
Barry Live in Britain – Barry Manilow – Live
Bean-Spill – The Minutemen – EP
Beasts (EP) – Sex Gang Children
Before a Word is Said – Alan Gowen, Phil Miller, Richard Sinclair, Trevor Tomkins
Black Metal – Venom
Black Tiger – Y&T
Boomerang – Shoes
Breaking the Chains – Dokken – original mix
Call of the West – Wall of Voodoo
Cat People – Giorgio Moroder – soundtrack
Cha – Jo Jo Zep & The Falcons
The Changeling – Toyah
Chris Rea – Chris Rea
Christ – The Album – Crass
Comeback – Eric Burdon
The Concerts in China – Jean-Michel Jarre
Deliver Us from Evil – Budgie
D.M.Z. (Resurrection Band album) – Resurrection Band
Dr. John Plays Mac Rebennack, Vol. 1 – Dr. John
Dreamgirls: Original Broadway Cast Album – Various Artists
D.S. al Coda – National Health
Echoes of an Era – Chaka Khan
Eddie Murphy – Eddie Murphy
Electric Rendezvous – Al Di Meola
Ella à Nice – Ella Fitzgerald
Enter K – Peter Hammill
Farover – Burning Spear
Fast Women and Slow Horses – Dr. Feelgood
The Fittest of the Fittest – Burning Spear
Flieg' Vogel flieg – Hans-Joachim Roedelius
Forging Ahead – Bad Manners
Gap Band IV – The Gap Band
Garista – Zoviet France
The Getaway – Chris de Burgh
Ghost Town – Poco
Glassworks – Philip Glass
Good Clean Fun – Bonnie Hayes
The Great Twenty-Eight – Chuck Berry – Compilation
Groovy Decay – Robyn Hitchcock
Here Today – David Grisman
Heartbeats and Triggers – Translator
Homotopy to Marie – Nurse With Wound
Hour Live – Toots & The Maytals
How Could Hell Be Any Worse? – Bad Religion
Humans Only – Earthstar
...If I Die, I Die – Virgin Prunes
In the Name of Love – Thompson Twins
Inside – Ronnie Milsap
Kansuigyo – Miyuki Nakajima
Kenny G – Kenny G
Leichenschrei – SPK
Levon Helm – Levon Helm
Life in the Jungle – The Shadows
Live at Abbey Road – The Shadows
Love Over and Over – Kate and Anna McGarrigle
Main Attraction – Suzi Quatro
Man Parrish – Man Parrish
Meat Puppets – Meat Puppets
Metal on Metal – Anvil
Miami – The Gun Club
Milo Goes to College – Descendents
Mondialement vôtre – Dalida
Money Talks – Trooper
Naked – Sex Gang Children
Night Birds – Shakatak
Night Nurse – Gregory Isaacs
No Stranger to Danger – Payolas
No Turning Back:Live – DeGarmo and Key – Live
Nona – Nona Hendryx
Nothing Can Stop Us – Robert Wyatt – Compilation
Now Then... – Stiff Little Fingers
Now You See Me...Now You Don't – Cliff Richard
Objects of Desire – Michael Franks
Off the Record – Neil Innes
Offene Türen – Hans-Joachim Roedelius
Offering – Axe
On Rock – Daniel Band
One Night at Budokan – Michael Schenker Group – Live
One Vice at a Time – Krokus
Only Theatre of Pain – Christian Death (debut)
Opus X – Chilliwack
The Other Woman – Ray Parker Jr.
Ping Pong over the Abyss – The 77s
Pleasure Victim – Berlin
Poet in My Window – Nanci Griffith
Por Amor – Menudo
Power Play – April Wine
Prairie Serenade – Riders in the Sky
Press the Eject and Give Me the Tape – Bauhaus – Live
Pure and Natural – T-Connection
Rêveries No. 2 – Richard Clayderman
Ruff Cuts EP – Twisted Sister
Select – Kim Wilde
Sleepwalking – Gerry Rafferty
Song of the Bailing Man – David Thomas & the Pedestrians
Songs of the Free – Gang of Four
Special Beat Service – The Beat
Spécial Dalida – Dalida
Speech and Music (Parole et musique) – Pierre Schaeffer
Stand by Your Man (EP) – Motörhead & Wendy O. Williams
Sub Pop 7 – Various Artists
Tenebrae – Simonetti-Morante-Pignatelli (Goblin) – Soundtrack
Tough – Kurtis Blow
Trance – Chris & Cosey
Troops of Tomorrow – The Exploited
Truce – Jack Bruce and Robin Trower
Turn It Loud – Headpins
TV Party (EP) – Black Flag
Underwater Kites – The Modern Art
Vandenberg – Vandenberg
The Very Best of Rufus Featuring Chaka Khan – Rufus – Compilation
Vs – Mission of Burma
Warrior Rock: Toyah on Tour – Toyah – Live
Wasted Youth – Girl
We Are...The League – Anti-Nowhere League
White Heart (album) – White Heart
Wild in the Streets – Circle Jerks
Windsong – Randy Crawford
Word and Music – Hank Marvin
Work of Heart – Roy Harper

Biggest hit singles 
The following songs achieved the highest chart positions
in the charts of 1982.

Chronological table of US and UK number one hit singles

Top 40 Chart hit singles

Other Chart hit singles

Notable singles

Other Notable singles

Published popular music 
 How Do You Keep the Music Playing? w. Alan Bergman & Marilyn Bergman m. Michel LeGrand.  From the film Best Friends.
 "Key Largo" w.m. Sonny Limbo & Bertie Higgins
"Let's Go to the Movies" w. Martin Charnin m. Charles Strouse from the film version of the musical Annie
"Sandy (Dumb Dog)" w. Martin Charnin m. Charles Strouse from the film version of the musical Annie
"Sign!" w. Martin Charnin w. Martin Charnin m. Charles Strouse from the film version of the musical Annie
"St. Elsewhere theme song" m. Dave Grusin
 "Up Where We Belong"     w. Will Jennings m. Buffy Sainte-Marie & Jack Nitzsche
"We Got Annie" w. Martin Charnin m. Charles Strouse from the film version of the musical Annie
"Where Everybody Knows Your Name" w.m. Judy Hart Angelo & Gary Portnoy, theme from the TV series Cheers
"Without Us" w. Tom Scott m. Jeff Barry, theme from the TV series Family Ties

Classical music 
Hans Abrahamsen – Nacht und Trompeten
George Crumb
Pastoral Drone for organ
Trio for Strings
Mario Davidovsky – String Trio for violin, viola, violoncello
Ross Edwards – Piano Concerto in A
Morton Feldman
Three Voices
For John Cage, for violin and piano
Lorenzo Ferrero
Thema 44 (ad honorem J. Haydn)
My Blues
Respiri
Soleils
Daron Hagen – Echo's Songs
Rudolf Komorous – Serenade for Strings
György Ligeti – Trio for Violin, Horn and Piano
Mel Powell – String Quartet
Poul Ruders
Manhattan Abstraction for orchestra
Greeting Concertino
Piano Sonata No. 2
Robert Simpson – String Quartet no. 9, 32 Variations and Fugue on a Theme of Haydn
Tōru Takemitsu
Rain Coming for chamber orchestra
Rain Spell for flute, clarinet, harp, piano and vibraphone
Jay Ungar – Ashokan Farewell

Ballet 
See List of 1982 ballet premieres

Opera 
Stephen Paulus – The Postman Always Rings Twice
Peter Sculthorpe – Quiros

Jazz

Musical theater 
 Andy Capp (Alan Price) – London production opened at the Aldwych Theatre on September 28 and ran for 99 performances
 Cats (Andrew Lloyd Webber) – Broadway production opened at the Winter Garden Theatre on October 7 and ran for 7485 performances, the longest run in the history of Broadway to date
 Joseph and the Amazing Technicolor Dreamcoat (Andrew Lloyd Webber and Tim Rice) – Broadway production opened at the Royale Theatre on January 27 and ran for 747 performances
 Little Shop of Horrors – off-Broadway production opened at the Orpheum Theatre on July 27 and ran for 2209 performances
 Nine – Broadway production opened at the 46th Street Theatre on May 9 and ran for 729 performances
 Pirates Of Penzance – London revival
 Seven Brides For Seven Brothers (Saul Chaplin, Gene de Paul and Johnny Mercer) – Broadway production opened at the Alvin Theatre on July 8 and ran for 5 performances
 Song and Dance (Andrew Lloyd Webber) – London production opened at the Palace Theatre on April 7 and ran for 781 performances

Musical films 
 Alice
 Annie
 The Best Little Whorehouse in Texas
 Disco Dancer
 Grease 2
 One from the Heart
 Parsifal
 Patnam Vachina Pativrathalu
 Pink Floyd – The Wall
 Starstruck
 Une chambre en ville
 Victor/Victoria
 Yes, Giorgio

Musical television 
 Live at Austin City Limits
 Sweeney Todd
 Liquid Sky

Births 
January 3 – Chisu, Finnish singer-songwriter
January 6 – Morgan Lander, Canadian musician (Kittie)
January 9 – Isaac Delahaye,  Belgian guitarist and composer
January 10 – Ana Layevska, Ukrainian–born, Mexican singer and actress
January 11 – Ashley Taylor Dawson, English actor and singer (allSTARS*)
January 12 – Nicole Morier,  American singer-songwriter and producer
January 14 – Caleb Followill, American musician (Kings of Leon)
January 15 – Ari Pulkkinen, Finnish pianist and composer
January 17 – Alex Varkatzas, Greek-American metalcore lead vocalist (Atreyu)
January 18
Quinn Allman, guitarist (The Used)
Joanna Newsom, American multi-instrumentalist, singer-songwriter and actress
January 19 – Angela Chang, Taiwanese singer and actress
January 21 – André Lousada, Portuguese conductor
January 23 – Statik Selektah, American DJ and record producer
January 24 – Daveed Diggs, American rapper, actor and singer
January 25 
 Noemi, Italian singer
 Sho Sakurai, Japanese singer
January 28 – Ryan Sheridan, Irish singer-songwriter and guitarist
January 29 – Adam Lambert, American singer, songwriter, stage actor, American Idol 8 finalist (Queen + Adam Lambert) 
January 31 
 Elena Paparizou, Greek-Swedish singer
 Yukimi Nagano, Swedish singer and songwriter (Little Dragon) 
February 1 – Kim Jong-wook, South Korean singer
February 3 – Jessica Harp, American singer and guitarist (The Wreckers)
February 4 – Kimberly Wyatt, American singer, dancer (The Pussycat Dolls)
February 7 – Delia Matache, Romanian singer
February 9 – Ami Suzuki, Japanese singer
February 10 – Darren McMullen, British-Australian The Voice TV host, actor, music critic and music journalist 
February 16 – Lupe Fiasco, American rapper
February 17 – Daniel Merriweather, British R&B musician
February 17 – February 18 – Nervo (DJs), Australian twin sister DJs 
February 18 – Juelz Santana, American rapper from Harlem, New York, and member of The Diplomats
February 22 – Danja, American record producer and songwriter (Britney Spears, Nelly Furtado, Justin Timberlake, Joe Jonas) 
February 25 – Bert McCracken, lead singer of American rock band The Used
February 26 – Nate Ruess, American singer-songwriter
March 2 – Jessica Biel, American actress, model, voice actress, producer and singer
March 4 – Amanda Shires,  American singer-songwriter and violin player.
March 13 – Darbuka Siva, Indian percussionist and composer
March 14 – Kate Maberly, English actress, director, writer, producer and musician
March 17 – Herman Sikumbang, Indonesian guitarist (d. 2018)
March 19 – Hana Kobayashi, Venezuelan singer of Japanese descent.
March 20 – Nick Wheeler, rock guitarist (The All-American Rejects)
March 21 
 Jocie Kok, Chinese-Singaporean singer
 Santino Fontana, American actor and singer 
March 22 
 Pete Bennett, English rock singer (Daddy Fantastic) and television personality (Big Brother 2006)
 Chris Wallace, American musician and singer 
April 3 – Cobie Smulders, Canadian singer and actress
April 5 – Pretty Sly, American R&B singer (Git Fresh)
April 7 – Kelli Young, English pop singer (Liberty X)
April 8 – Keegan DeWitt, American singer-songwriter and actor (Wild Cub)
April 10 – Nadia Meikher, Ukrainian singer-songwriter
April 12 – Easton Corbin, American country music singer
April 13
 Ty Dolla Sign, American singer, songwriter and rapper
 Nellie McKay, American singer
April 18 – Marie-Élaine Thibert, Canadian singer
April 21 – Lynn Hilary, Irish singer-songwriter and guitarist (Celtic Woman and Anúna)
April 24 – Kelly Clarkson, American singer, songwriter, actress and author, first American Idol winner
April 26
Nadja Benaissa, German pop singer
Jon Lee, English singer (S Club 7)
April 30 
 Lloyd Banks, African American/Puerto Rican rapper
 Drew Seeley, Canadian actor, singer-songwriter and dancer
 Kirsten Dunst, American actress, model and singer 
May 4 – Vera Schmidt, Hungarian singer-songwriter
May 11 – Cory Monteith, Canadian actor and musician (d. 2013) 
May 14 – Dan Nigro, American songwriter and producer (As Tall As Lions) 
May 15 
 Layal Abboud, Lebanese singer
 Jessica Sutta, American singer, dancer, songwriter, actress and choreographer (The Pussycat Dolls)
May 16
 Billy Crawford, Filipino-American singer
 Dimitri Vegas, Belgian DJ, producer and half of Dimitri Vegas & Like Mike
May 23 – Tristan Prettyman, American singer-songwriter, musician and Foxy Model
May 27 – Louis Bell, American musician, record producer and mixer
June 2 – Jewel Staite, Canadian actress and singer
June 3 – Dihan Slabbert, South African singer-songwriter and producer
June 4 – Jin Au-Yeung, Chinese-American rapper
June 5 – Scott Speer,  American filmmaker, music video director, television director and novelist.
June 7 – Amy Nuttall, British actress and opera singer
June 13 – Jessica Caban, American fashion model, actress, musician and muse of Bruno Mars
June 14 – Lang Lang, Chinese concert pianist
June 17 – Arthur Darvill, English actor and musician (Doctor Who) 
June 21 – Jussie Smollett, American singer, actor, activist, director and photographer
June 23 – Candice Alley, Australian singer-songwriter ("Falling", Colorblind) 
June 25 – Lola Ponce, Argentinian-Italian singer-songwriter and actress
July 5 – Dave Haywood, American singer-songwriter and guitarist (Lady Antebellum)
July 6 – Tay Zonday, American musician and voice actor
July 7 
 Cassidy, American hip hop recording artist and rapper
 Julien Doré, French singer-songwriter, musician and actor
July 10 – Alex Arrowsmith, American rock musician
July 12 
 Mahalia Barnes, Australian singer-songwriter and manager, (Jimmy Barnes, Reece Mastin) 
 Walter Perez, American actor and musician
July 15 
 Carl Espen, Norwegian singer and songwriter
 Haley Scarnato, American singer and American Idol finalist
July 17 – Natasha Hamilton, English pop singer-songwriter(Atomic Kitten)
July 18 
 Ryan Cabrera, American singer-songwriter and musician (Ashlee Simpson, Lisa Origliasso, Riley Keough, Audrina Patridge) 
 Priyanka Chopra,  Indian actress, singer, film producer and philanthropist
July 19 – Christopher Bear, American drummer (Grizzly Bear)
July 23 
 Claudette Ortiz, American soul singer
 Ricky Reed,  American artist, music producer, singer, songwriter and founder
July 30 – Rebecca Stephens, English singer (The Pipettes)
August 1 – Orelsan, French rapper
August 4 – Quindon Tarver, American singer (d. 2021)
August 6 – Spice, Jamaican dancehall singer and songwriter
August 7 – Abbie Cornish, Australian actress and rapper under the pseudonym "Dusk"  
August 8 – Raef, Egyptian-American singer and songwriter
August 10 – Vincent Rodriguez III, American actor, singer and dancer
August 16 – Ummet Ozcan, Dutch-Turkish DJ and producer
August 19 
 Willy Denzey, French singer
 Erika Christensen, American actress and singer
August 22 – Boys Noize, German EDM DJ and producer
August 27 – Duke Dumont, British record producer, songwriter, musician and DJ
August 28 – LeAnn Rimes, American singer, songwriter, actress and author
August 29 – Mayana Moura, Brilizian singer, actress and model
September 3
Andrew McMahon, American musician
Kaori Natori, Japanese singer and model
September 5 – Cyndi Wang, Taiwanese singer and actress
September 7 – Race Wong, Hong Kong singer/actress (2R)
September 9 – Ai Otsuka, Japanese singer
September 14 – Wes Carr, Australian singer-songwriter and multi-instrumentalist (Australian Idol 8) 
September 17 – Wade Robson, American choreographer, producer, songwriter and dancer (Britney Spears, Justin Timberlake) 
September 19 – Skepta,  British grime MC, rapper, songwriter and record producer. 
September 20 – Ian Kirkpatrick (record producer), American songwriter and record producer (worked with Dua Lipa, Selena Gomez, Britney Spears) 
September 22 – Billie Piper, British singer and actress
September 27 
 Anna Camp, American actress-singer (Pitch Perfect)
 Jon McLaughlin, American pop rock singer-songwriter, producer and pianist 
 Lil Wayne, American rapper
September 28 – St. Vincent (musician), American singer-songwriter, multi instrumentalist and guitar designer
September 29 – Stephen "tWitch" Boss, American hip hip dancer, DJ, actor and entertainer 
October 1 – Sandra Oxenryd, Swedish pop singer
October 6 – MC Lars, American rapper
October 7 – Lockett Pundt, American singer-songwriter and guitarist (Deerhunter)
October 15 – Paulini, Fijian-born Australian singer, songwriter and actress
October 18 – Ne-Yo, American R&B singer
October 19 – Hiromi Hayakawa, Japanese-born Mexican actress and singer (d. 2017)
October 25 – Eman Lam, Hong Kong singer
October 27 
 Keri Hilson, American singer
 Jessy Matador, Congolese-French singer
October 28 – Mai Kuraki, Japanese singer
November 6 – Sowelu, Japanese singer
November 12 – Anne Hathaway, American actress, musical star and singer
November 13
Michael Copon, American actor model and singer
Kumi Koda, Japanese singer
November 14 – Joy Williams (singer), American singer-songwriter
November 15 – Jenifer (singer), French singer and actress
November 18 – Aoife O'Donovan, Irish-American singer and songwriter
November 22 
 Charlene Choi, Hong Kong singer and actress
Steve Angello, Greek Swedish DJ, music producer and 
November 23 – Leah Jenner, American musician
December 1 – Riz Ahmed, British actor, rapper, and activist
December 3 – Jaycee Chan, Hong Kong actor and singer
December 5 – Keri Hilson, American singer, songwriter and actress
December 7 – Chrispa, Greek singer and actress
December 8
 Chrisette Michele, American R&B singer-songwriter
 Nicki Minaj, American rapper and singer
 Serena Ryder, Canadian musician
December 13 – Anthony Callea, Australian singer
December 14 – Anthony Way, British singer and actor
December 16
 Frankie Ballard, American country music singer-songwriter
 Mei Finegold, Israeli singer
 Anna Sedokova, Ukrainian singer, actress and television presenter
December 20
David Cook, American singer
Jason Zhang, Chinese pop singer
December 23 
Beatriz Luengo, Spanish singer, songwriter, actress, dancer and entrepreneur
Toru Kitajima, Japanese singer(Ling tosite Sigure)
December 24 
 Masaki Aiba, Japanese singer
 Robert Carmine, vocalist (Rooney)
December 27 – Terji Skibenæs, Faroese guitarist (Týr)
Undated
 Guanqun Yu, Chinese operatic soprano
 Mai Khôi, Vietnamese singer and political dissident
 Caroline Shaw, American composer, violinist and singer
 Sonia Paço-Rocchia, Canadian composer, bassoon free-improviser

Deaths 
January – Sudhin Dasgupta, music director, lyricist, and singer, 52
January 16 – Harald Agersnap, Danish classical musician, 92
January 17 – Tommy Tucker, songwriter, 48 (carbon tetrachloride poisoning)
January 19 – Elis Regina, Brazilian singer, 36 (drug/alcohol overdose)
January 30
Stanley Holloway, English actor and singer, 91
Lightnin' Hopkins, blues singer, 69
February 4 – Alex Harvey, rock singer and guitarist, 46
February 17 – Thelonious Monk, jazz pianist, 64
February 18 – Nathaniel Shilkret, composer and musician, 92
February 21 – Murray the K, disc jockey, 60
February 25 – Chao Yuen Ren, composer, 89
March 5 – John Belushi, entertainer of The Blues Brothers fame, 33 (drug overdose)
March 19 – Randy Rhoads, guitarist, 25 (plane crash)
March 24 – Aileen Stanley, singer, 84 or 85
March 26 – Ferdinando Garimberti, violin maker, 88
March 29 – Carl Orff, German composer, famous for the choral work Carmina Burana, 86
April 2 – Sam Coslow, songwriter and singer, 79
April 30 – Lester Bangs, American music journalist, 33
May 1 – William Primrose, violist, 77
May 5 – Cal Tjader, Latin jazz musician, 56
May 8 – Neil Bogart, owner of Casablanca Records, 39 (cancer)
May 12 – Humphrey Searle, composer, 66
May 13 – Renzo Rossellini, film composer, 74
May 15 – Joëlle Mogensen, French singer, 29 (drug overdose)
May 16 – Adriano Correia de Oliveira, Portuguese composer and singer, 40
May 26 – Nanny Larsén-Todsen, operatic soprano, 97
May 30 – Leon René, songwriter, 80
June 15 – Art Pepper, jazz saxophonist, 56 (brain hemorrhage)
June 16 – James Honeyman-Scott, guitarist, 25 (heart failure from cocaine use)
July 8 – Aino Seep, Estonian singer and actress, 57
July 9 – Wingy Manone, jazz trumpeter, 82
July 10 – Maria Jeritza, operatic soprano, 96
July 15 – Bill Justis, American saxophonist, songwriter, and producer, 55 (cancer)
July 15 – Lionel Daunais, Canadian baritone and composer, 80
July 22 – Sonny Stitt, jazz saxophonist, 58
July 28 – Keith Green, gospel singer, 28 (plane crash)
August 13 – Joe Tex, Southern soul singer, 49
August 25 – Anna German, Polish singer, 46
September 1 – Clifford Curzon, pianist, 75
September 12 – Federico Moreno Torroba, composer, 91
September 14 – Christian Ferras, French violinist, 49 (suicide)
September 17 – Manos Loïzos, Greek composer, 44
September 23 – Jimmy Wakely, American Country-Western singer and actor, 68
September 29 – A. L. Lloyd, folk song collector, 74
October 4 – Glenn Gould, pianist, 50 (stroke)
October 16
Jakov Gotovac, composer and conductor, 87
Mario del Monaco, operatic tenor, 67
October 21 – Radka Toneff, Norwegian jazz singer, 30
October 29 – William Lloyd Webber, British organist and composer, 68
November 16 – Al Haig, jazz pianist, 58
December 2 – David Blue, folk singer, 41
December 8 – Marty Robbins, country singer, 57
December 10 – Roy Webb, film composer, 94

Awards

Grammy Awards 
Grammy Awards of 1982

Country Music Association Awards 
1982 Country Music Association Awards

Eurovision Song Contest 
Eurovision Song Contest 1982

Charts

List of No. 1 Hits 
Hot 100 No. 1 Hits of 1982

See also 
 1982 in music (UK)
 Record labels established in 1982
 List of 'years in music'

References 

 
20th century in music
Music by year